"Dangerous" is the second single from Dutch symphonic metal and rock band Within Temptation from their sixth studio album Hydra. It was released exclusively to iTunes on 20 December 2013 with an accompanying music video. The song features guest vocals from ex-Killswitch Engage lead singer Howard Jones.

Background
During den Adel's promotional travelings throughout Europe, critics and radio stations were given access to the new material, and the first public impression came through German radio station Rock Antenne, along with the first preview of "Dangerous", which was considered "fast" and "aggressive". The song is one of the band's heaviest to date, as den Adel stated that "it has the most bass drums we've ever used, too, and a very fast riff which we doubled with synths. It's not a typical synthesizer, though — it's distorted like a guitar, and it's very aggressive."

Track listing

Music video
The music video was released on 20 December 2013 and was directed by Patric Ullaeus. The video features Howard Jones singing in Winnipeg, Manitoba Canada. He stands near Chez Sophie Sur Le Pont, (restaurant) on the Esplanade Riel (pedestrian bridge) next to the Provencher St. bridge. The band perform in a large room with lights wearing dark clothing. The main focus of the video is renowned skydiver Jokke Sommer, who is seen performing gliding through the air and pulling off impressive stunts such as navigating through a narrow gap between two buildings, over Lapa and around Sugarloaf in Rio de Janeiro. Howard Jones' dangerous feat is simply being outside during a Winnipeg winter.

References

2013 singles
Within Temptation songs
Male–female vocal duets
2013 songs
Nuclear Blast Records singles
Songs written by Robert Westerholt
Songs written by Sharon den Adel